Ascobolus brassicae is a species of apothecial fungus belonging to the family Ascobolaceae.

This is a European species appearing as tiny off-white (later turning purple) discs, with toothed edges, up to 1 mm across on animal dung, especially that of rodents. It is also found on rotting Brassica stems which gives rise to the specific name.

References

External links

Pezizales
Fungi described in 1857